Battle of Belchite may refer to:
Battle of Belchite (1809) during the Peninsular War
Battle of Belchite (1937) during the Spanish Civil War
Battle of Belchite (1938) during the Spanish Civil War